The Horizon League Men's Basketball Player of the Year is a basketball award given to the Horizon League's most outstanding player. The award was first given following the 1979–80 season, the first year of the conference's existence. Seven players have won the award multiple times: Byron Larkin, Brian Grant, Rashad Phillips, Alfredrick Hughes, Keifer Sykes, Loudon Love, and Antoine Davis. Hughes, unlike the other four who each won twice, was awarded the player of the year on three occasions.

There have only been three ties in the award's history (1981, 1983, 2022). Butler, which left for the Atlantic 10 Conference in 2012 and is now in the Big East Conference, has seven recipients, which is tied for the most all-time with Detroit Mercy. Four current members of the Horizon League have never had a winner – IUPUI, Purdue Fort Wayne, Robert Morris, and Youngstown State. However, these schools include the conference's three newest members—IUPUI joined in 2017, while Purdue Fort Wayne and Robert Morris joined in 2020. The only long-established member without a winner is Youngstown State, which joined in 2002.

Key

Winners

Winners by school

Footnotes

References
 General

 Specific

Awards established in 1980
NCAA Division I men's basketball conference players of the year
Player